Coldbackie is a crofting township in Sutherland and is in the Scottish council area of Highland Scotland.

Geography
It sits under Cnoc an Fhreiceadain (the Watch Hill), looking north across Tongue Bay to the Rabbit Islands. It is one of a series of townships, running from Tongue along the A836 to Blandy.

Etymology
The name Coldbackie could have old Norse or Gaelic roots. The place name Coldbackie is not unique to the Kyle of Tongue, with there being two Coldbacks in Shetland (in Unst and Delting) and one in north west Iceland, both areas where Norse roots would be more likely. Omand, in The Sutherland book, translates Coldbackie as kula-bakki, bank with the bump, whilst Stewart, in Place names of Shetland says that Coldbacks is Cold Hill.

References

External links
 Coldbackie on the web
 Section on Coldbackie

Populated places in Sutherland